Lenox Elementary School can refer to more than one educational institution in the United States:

A school in the Hillsboro School District in Hillsboro, Oregon
A school in the Baldwin Union Free School District on Long Island in New York
A former school in the St. Louis Park School District in St. Louis Park, Minnesota